The Intrusive Suite of Merced Peak is one of several intrusive suites in Yosemite National Park. These also include:

 Fine Gold Intrusive Suite
 Intrusive Suite of Buena Vista Crest
 Intrusive Suite of Jack Main Canyon
 Intrusive Suite of Sonora Pass
 Intrusive Suite of Yosemite Valley
 Tuolumne Intrusive Suite

Geology
The Intrusive Suite of Merced Peak dates to roughly 98 Ma.  The formation dates to mid-Cretaceous. It lies within the volcanogenic Minarets sequence, and comprises the granodiorite of Jackass Lakes and the leucogranites of Timber Knob and Norris Creek. Most of the suite is the former.

See also
 Merced Peak

References

External links
 One reference

Geology of California
Geology of Yosemite National Park